Lars Daniel Björkman (born 21 February 1993) is a Swedish footballer who plays as a centre-back. He has previously played for KÍ, Örebro SK, BK Forward, IK Brage.

Career
Björkman started his football career with Samuelsdals IF in Falun. In 2012, he moved to IK Brage, before joining Örebro-based club BK Forward in 2015.

After strong performances in 2018, several clubs showed interest. Björkman had trials with AIK, IFK Göteborg, and Örebro SK. Eventually, he signed a two-year contract with Örebro SK. In February 2021, Björkman moved to Faroe Islands Premier League club KÍ on a one-year contract. He left the club after his contract expired in December 2021.

Honours
KÍ
 Faroe Islands Premier League: 2021

References

1993 births
Living people
Swedish footballers
Swedish expatriate footballers
Association football defenders
IK Brage players
BK Forward players
Örebro SK players
KÍ Klaksvík players
Allsvenskan players
Faroe Islands Premier League players
Expatriate footballers in the Faroe Islands
Swedish expatriate sportspeople in the Faroe Islands
People from Falun
Sportspeople from Dalarna County